The transverse muscle of tongue (transversus linguae) is an intrinsic muscle of the tongue. It consists of fibers which arise from the median fibrous septum. It passes laterally to insert into the submucous fibrous tissue at the sides of the tongue. It is innervated by the hypoglossal nerve (cranial nerve XII). Its contraction elongates and narrows the tongue.

Structure 
The transverse muscle of the tongue is an intrinsic muscle of the tongue. It consists of fibers which arise from the median fibrous septum. It passes laterally to insert into the submucous fibrous tissue at the sides of the tongue.

Innervation 
The transverse lingual muscle is innervated by the hypoglossal nerve (CN XII).

Function 
Contraction of the transverse muscle of the tongue elongates and narrows the tongue.

References 

Muscles of the head and neck
Tongue